Barthold "Bart" Fles (February 7, 1902 – December 19, 1989) was a Dutch-American literary agent, author, translator, editor and publisher. Among his many clients were Elias Canetti, Raymond Loewy, Heinrich Mann, Joseph Roth, Felix Salten, Ignazio Silone, Bruno Walter and Arnold Zweig.

Early life and education 
Barthold Fles was born in Amsterdam into an assimilating Jewish family. His father, Louis Fles, was a successful businessman and an activist against religion. Barthold had a tense relationship with his father, who wanted him into his business, while the young Fles was mostly interested in reading. Barthold read in Dutch, German, English, and French, anytime and at a tremendous pace. He did study business at a vocational school and found employment at De Lange publishers. 

In 1923 he left for the United States. In New York Fles found temporary employment as a violinist, painting apartments, selling vacuum cleaners and working for publishers.

Literary agency 
In 1933, he established a literary agency in Manhattan, New York. Initially many of his clients were German refugees and other foreign authors. He organized evenings for these authors in New York, in order to get them acquainted with the American book market. From the 1940s onwards most of his clientele was from the United States.

Fles was a special figure in the lives of many of his clients. He kept closely in touch, encouraged his authors to concentrate on their art, and arranged fellowships with literary funds. Still, some clients moved on to larger agencies, or were later represented by publishing houses, lawyers, or by themselves, often after long relationships. An exception was Anaïs Nin who left him soon after she joined his client circle, citing unorganized business conduct as a reason. "Bonjour, friend, and good-bye, literary agent", she wrote to him. In biographical notes on Fles, however, she stated that he had refused to take on her boyfriend Henry Miller. Miller himself also had hard feelings, calling Fles dishonest and part of the publishing establishment. Fles was influential during several decades in getting blacklisted authors published.

Barthold Fles wrote two juvenile books: Slavonic rhapsody: the life of Antonín Dvořák (1948) under the pseudonym Jan van Straaten (Van Straaten being his mother's maiden name) and East Germany (1973). He also wrote introductions to compilations and many articles and translated several books from German to English. Among the translations was another children's book, Bambi's Children by Felix Salten. His non-fictional writings and his translations received considerable praise, except for his book on Germany. This book was clearly outside his (music and literature) expertise and sealed his writing for publication, set aside an intro to More by Dell Shannon (1982), by his prolific client Elizabeth Linington.

Personal and legacy 
In 1936 Barthold married Ruth Grünwald, a dancer at the Metropolitan Opera who had been just one year in the United States. Ruth assisted Barthold at his literary agency. Later she left him.

In 1986, at the age of 84, Fles closed his agency. Subsequently, he returned to his native Netherlands, where he spent his last three years in Laren's Rosa Spier home for retired artists. At Rosa Spier he was approached by Madeleine Rietra, a Dutch expert on German literature, who posthumously published his letter exchange with clients Joseph Roth (bookchapter in 1991) and Heinrich Mann (book in 1993), along with commentaries and biographical notes.

Barthold Fles, a diabetic for several decades, died on December 19, 1989, aged 87.

Clients

 Rankin Barbee
 Cedric Belfrage
 Don Berry
 Wilhelmina de Bois
 Robbie Branscum
 Bertolt Brecht
 Elias Canetti
 Whittaker Chambers
 Fred Cook
 L. Sprague de Camp
 Maurits Dekker
 Ed Dolan
 Mary Dolim
 A. den Doolaard
 Albert Ehrenstein
 Otto Eisenschiml
 Carlos Embry
 Guy Endore

 Charles Finney
 Lion Feuchtwanger
 James Herndon
 Langston Hughes
 Dola de Jong
 Carl Jung
 Irmgard Keun
 Otto Klemperer
 Oskar Kokoschka
 Dean Koontz
 Ernst Krenek
 Joseph Wood Krutch
 Margaret Larkin
 Raymond Loewy
 Walter Lowenfels
 Elizabeth Linington
 Richard Lyttle

 Erika Mann
 Heinrich Mann
 Klaus Mann
 Walter Mehring
 Jessica Mitford
 Helen Markley Miller
 Rutherford Montgomery
 Gorham Munson
 Bud Murphy
 Hans Natonek
 Rose Naumann
 Anaïs Nin
 Hollister Noble
 Iris Noble
 Leo Perutz

 Lea Bayers Rapp
 Theodor Reik
 Jean Rikhoff
 Henriette Roland Holst
 Joseph Roth
 Jean Rouverol
 Felix Salten
 Richard Sharpe
 Ignazio Silone
 Henry Simon
 Stan Steiner
 Janet Stevenson
 Philip Stevenson
 Bruno Walter
 Jakob Wassermann
 Frank Waters
 Kurt Weill
 Arnold Zweig

Publications

Books

Written
 1948 - Slavonic rhapsody: The life of Antonín Dvořák
 1973 - East Germany
 1993 - Briefwechsel mit Barthold Fles, 1942-1949 (with Heinrich Mann; editor Madeleine Rietra)

Compiled
 1948 - The best short stories from Collier's
 1949 - Seven short novels from the Woman's Home Companion
 1951 - The Saturday Evening Post western stories
 1951 - The Saturday Evening Post Fantasy Stories

Translated
 1939 - Ernst Krenek: Music here and now
 1939 - Felix Salten: Bambi's children
 1943 - Hans Natonek: In search of myself

Published
These German Exilliteratur poetry books were published by Barthold Fles Verlag, New York
 1941 - Max Herrmann-Neisse: Letzte Gedichte
 1941 - Berthold Viertel: Fürchte dich nicht! Neue Gedichte
 1942 - Hans Sahl: Der hellen Nächte, Gedichte Aus Frankreich
 1942 - Max Hermann-Neisse: Mir bleibt mein Lied, Auswahl aus unveröffentlichten Gedichten (posthumous publication)

Articles

Written
 1928-09-15 - Chávez lights new music with old fires. Musical America 48 (22): 5 & 21.
 1932-05-18 - The Price of Being Sensible. The Nation 134 (3489): 576.
 1934-07-04 - Now as a Story Teller. The New Republic: 216. (book review of Kaleidoscope by Stefan Zweig)
 1935-03-10 - In Holland Writers Favor the Exotic. The New York Times: BR 8 & ?.
 1935-10-27 - Van Gogh Letters and Other Dutch Books. The New York Times: BR 8 & ?.
 1935-12-24 - The Literary Scene In Holland. The New York Times: 61.
 1935-11-02 - Rococo Italy in a Picaresque Novel. The Saturday Review of Literature 8 (1): 12.
 1936 - Literature in Exile. Story 9: 8, 101-102.
 1936-08-23 - Holland Turns to the Historical Novel. The New York Times: BR 8.
 1945-07-28 -  What Has Happened to Them Since? Reply. Publishers Weekly: 307.
 1950-06-04 - A Literary Letter about Holland. The New York Times: BR 11.
 1951-10 and 11 - The Literary Agent. The Writer 64 (10): 319-323, (11): 361-365. (also included in the book Briefwechsel mit Barthold Fles)

Translated
 1935 - Nettie Sutro: Biographical Note on the author in Ignazio Silone: Mr. Aristotle

Biography
 Madeleine Rietra: "Der New Yorker Literaturagent Barthold Fles als Vermittler zwischen der alten und neuen Welt (1933-1945)" in Batts MS (ed.): Alte Welten - neue Welten, Akten des IX. Kongresses der Internationale Vereinigung für Germanische Sprach- und Literaturwissenschaft. Tübingen: Niemeyer, 1996, p. 164. .
 Madeleine Rietra: "Heinrich Mann/Barthold Fles: Autor/Agent" in Würzner H, Kröhnke K (eds.): Deutsche Literatur im Exil in den Niederlanden 1933-1940. Amsterdam: Rodopi, 1994, p 151-162. .
 Els Andringa (2012): "Mediatie en transfer van Duitse Exilliteratuur in Nederlandse setting; Over de rol van mediatoren met bijzondere aandacht voor de opkomst van literaire agenten". Tijdschrift voor Nederlandse Taal- en Letterkunde, volume 128, p. 276.

References

External links
Interview with Dutch broadcaster VPRO

Literary agents
1902 births
1989 deaths
20th-century American non-fiction writers
20th-century Dutch writers
20th-century American translators
American book editors
American book publishers (people)
American children's writers
American people of Dutch-Jewish descent
Businesspeople from Amsterdam
Businesspeople from New York City
Deaths from diabetes
Dutch children's writers
Dutch emigrants to the United States
Dutch Jews
Dutch non-fiction writers
Dutch publishers (people)
Dutch translators
German–English translators
Jewish American writers
People from Laren, North Holland
People from Manhattan
Writers from New York (state)
Writers from Amsterdam
20th-century American businesspeople
20th-century American Jews
Exilliteratur